Bernardo de Gálvez is a bronze equestrian statue of Bernardo de Gálvez, 1st Viscount of Galveston, sculpted by Juan de Ávalos of Spain.

Description and history

Located in the American national capital of Washington, D.C., it was dedicated on June 3, 1976, one month and a day before Independence Day of the Fourth of July, 1776. The statue was a gift from Spain to the United States upon the occasion of the U.S.A.'s Bicentennial (1776–1976) commemoration, 200 years later after the American Revolution and subsequent  American Revolutionary War (1776–1783).

The Bernardo de Gálvez sculpture is located along with the Statues of the Liberators, at Virginia Avenue and 22nd Street, N.W., near the United States Department of State building in the Foggy Bottom neighborhood in Washington, D.C. It was dedicated by King Juan Carlos I of the Kingdom of Spain

The inscription on the base reads:

(Front:) 
BERNARDO DE GALVEZ
(COUNT DE GALVEZ)
1746–1786

(Side:) 
BERNARDO DE GALVEZ THE GREAT
SPANISH SOLDIER CARRIED OUT
A COURAGEOUS CAMPAIGN IN
LANDS BORDERING THE LOWER
MISSISSIPPI. THIS MASTERPIECE
OF MILITARY STRATEGY LIGHTENED
THE PRESSURE OF THE ENGLISH
IN THE WAR AGAINST THE AMERICAN
SETTLERS WHO WERE FIGHTING FOR
THEIR INDEPENDENCE.
MAY THE STATUE OF BERNARDO
DE GALVEZ SERVE AS A REMINDER
THAT SPAIN OFFERED THE BLOOD
OF HER SOLDIERS FOR THE CAUSE
OF AMERICAN INDEPENDENCE.
Excerpts of a speech
given on this location
on June 3, 1976 byHis Majesty
DON JUAN CARLOS I
King of Spain

Sculptor
Juan de Ávalos
Madrid, Spain

See also
 List of public art in Washington, D.C., Ward 2
 Statues of the Liberators

References

External links
 
 Entry on THE HISTORICAL MARKER DATABASE
 Victor Lang Remembers- Bernardo de Galvez Statue Should Be Moved To Galveston

1976 sculptures
Artworks in the collection of the National Park Service
Bronze sculptures in Washington, D.C.
Equestrian statues in Washington, D.C.
Monuments and memorials in Washington, D.C.
Northwest (Washington, D.C.)
Outdoor sculptures in Washington, D.C.
Sculptures of men in Washington, D.C.